Dr Noël Harwood Tredinnick  (born 9 March 1949) is a British composer, organist, orchestrator and conductor. He was awarded a Lambeth DMus degree in March 2002. In Queen Elizabeth's Birthday Honours bestowed in 2021, he received a BEM (British Empire Medal) for life-long services to Church Music and Music Education. Noël has toured extensively in Europe, the U.S., Australia and South Africa as both lecturer and conductor.

He is noted for his many contributions to several hymnals, his regular appearances on the BBC's Songs of Praise, presenting his weekly radio programme All Souls in Praise and daily radio programme All Souls In Praise Bitesize which broadcasts on Premier Christian Radio. He is the founder and Emeritus Conductor of All Souls Orchestra which performs annually at the Royal Albert Hall and throughout the UK under the banner of "Prom Praise" and "Prom Praise for Schools" (PP4S). 

Tredinnick's organ works have been performed by several respected performers including George Thalben-Ball, Nicolas Kynaston, and Gerard Brooks. He is currently a Professor of conducting, orchestration and academic studies at the Guildhall School of Music and Drama and has recently been awarded the title of Emeritus Conductor of the All Souls Orchestra, in recognition of his pioneering legacy in directing Christian musical worship around the world.  He continues to conduct the orchestra in tours of the UK and around the world, in partnership with his successor, Michael Andrews.

Tredinnick's arranging style combines traditional hymns and Christian songs with harmonies from jazz and modernist music, making frequent use of chromaticism and dissonance. His trademark sound is euphoric, uplifting and spontaneous, with an inclusive feel. He is generally regarded as one of the UK's foremost church musicians.

Tredinnick has been involved with the Jubilate Group for many years, which is concerned with updating old-fashioned language in hymnody and for publishing new musical resources for congregations; he is now chair of the group.

All Souls Orchestra
In 1972 Tredinnick was appointed Organist and Director of Music at the church of All Souls, Langham Place, in the heart of the West End of London: a post he still holds. He founded the All Souls Orchestra on the instruction of the then rector, the hymnwriter Michael Baughen, and has since conducted the orchestra at many Christian events, services and festivals in the UK and internationally. The orchestra is well-known as a distinctive voice in Christian worship, providing uplifting accompaniments to hymns and popular songs as well as performing classical works in a Christian context.

Tredinnick is well-known for his expansive, expressive and personal style of directing and coaxing, as well as for his persuasive eye-contact and personable manner. He has conducted the orchestra alongside several notable singers and songwriters including Cliff Richard, Keith and Kristyn Getty, and Stuart Townend. The orchestra performed alongside Richard on a BBC Songs of Praise episode entitled "The Gospel According to Cliff".

He continues to work with notable Christian artists, both established and new, including Paul Baloche, Christy Nockels, Matt Redman, Tim Hughes, Graham Kendrick, Ben Cantelon, Noel Robinson, Reuben Morgan of Hillsong, and classical soprano Joanne Lunn.

Tredinnick was awarded the British Empire Medal (BEM) in the 2021 Birthday Honours for services to church music and music education.

Other work
Tredinnick has released a recording of operatic arias for soprano with Vania Vatralova-Stankov and the Sofia Symphony Orchestra, and a celtic/rock fusion album (Woven Chord) with the band Iona.

His arrangements of traditional hymns continue to be popular in the Christian community, with favourities including his arrangements of 'Londonderry Air' and 'Blaenwern' ('Love Divine All Loves Excelling'). These arrangements use alternative and sometimes surprising chords to adjust the music and emphasise the emotional quality of certain words or themes. He is also the composer of the well-known hymn tune 'Old Yeavering'- written for Michael Perry's 'Like a Mighty River Flowing', and several widely-adopted arrangements of popular hymns including 'A Purple Robe' by Timothy Dudley-Smith. He was a major contributor to the hymn books 'Mission Praise', 'Carol Praise' and 'Sing Glory', among others.

Tredinnick was responsible for much of the congregational music at former Archbishop of Canterbury George Carey's enthronement in April 1991 at Canterbury Cathedral.  He introduced a more contemporary language to a service, which up to that point, had primarily embraced a more traditional language. Tredinnick believes that new music is the natural result of faith. He has written that "Creativity goes hand in hand with an alive experience of the Lord as Christians express their own love and share their faith in words."

Works

Organ
 Brief Encounters

Hymnody
 Argent
 Come Rejoice
 Enigma
 God of Unchanging Grace
 God Whose Love is Everywhere
 Gracious God
 Jubilate Deo
 Old Yeavering
 Revelation
 Victor's Crown
 Whitsun Psalm

Partial discography
 (All Souls Orchestra) (2018).  Prom Praise: Christmas. conducted by Noël Tredinnick and Michael Andrews.

 
 
Beverley Trotman, Joanne Lunn, Grace Yeo et al. (All Souls Orchestra) (2010).  Prom Praise – How Great Thou Art.  
 
Sarah Stroh, Doug Walker, and Gerard Brooks et al. (All Souls Orchestra) (2005).  Prom Praise: Moved by Compassion.  conducted by Noël Tredinnick.

References

English organists
British male organists
English composers
Christian hymnwriters
English hymnwriters
English conductors (music)
British male conductors (music)
1949 births
Living people
21st-century British conductors (music)
21st-century organists
21st-century British male musicians
Recipients of the British Empire Medal